Abu Ma'shar is an Arabic name which might refer to any one of the following people:

 Abu Ma'shar al-Balkhi (787–886), Muslim astrologer of the 9th Century AD
 Abu Ma'shar Najih al-Sindi al-Madani (died 787), Muslim historian of the 8th Century AD